Arif Abd al-Raziq (born in Tulkarem, 1894, died in Bulgaria 1944) was one of the Palestinian leaders of the 1936–1939 Arab revolt in Palestine.

References 

Rebel commanders of the 1936–1939 Arab revolt in Palestine
1894 births
1944 deaths